Crotalus durissus, known as the South American rattlesnake, tropical rattlesnake, and by other names, is a highly venomous pit viper species found in South America. It is the most widely distributed member of its genus. Currently, seven subspecies are recognized.

Taxonomy
The Guiana rattlesnake, previously recognized as C. d. dryinus, is now considered a synonym for C. d. durissus. In fact, after the previous nominate subspecies for the C. d. durissus complex became the current nominate for Crotalus simus, which now represents its Mexican and Central American members, C. d. dryinus became the new nominate for the South American rattlesnakes as represented by C. durissus. The subspecies previously known as C. d. collilineatus and C. d. cascavella were moved to the synonymy of C. d. terrificus following the publication of a paper by Wüster et al. in 2005.

Subspecies

Description
It has two distinct stripes starting at the base of the head. Within the lines, the color is lighter than the stripes.

The color and pattern of the body are quite variable, most with an 18–32 dorsal with a darker diamond, and rhombic spots, 25–33 (usually 27) rows of dorsal scale in the middle of the body. The head has a dark brown bar at the top, with a dark post-orbital band. The color of the belly varies, it can be white or yellowish, with light gray spots, becoming darker towards the tail. The tail is usually gray, with dark and vague crossed bands.

Behaviour
The species is more active at dusk and in the early hours of the morning; it is usually not aggressive towards humans, but can bite if cornered or threatened.

Reproduction
The South American rattlesnake has a seasonal reproductive cycle; competition between males (for access to females) begins around the summer's end, with copulation occurring during the fall, and the birth of the young taking place the following spring/summer. Reproduction is ovoviviparous, giving birth to 4–8 young. In Roraima, Brazil it has been reported that the gestation lasts for 5 months, and they are capable of giving birth to up to 14 young.

Diet 
The diet consists mainly of rodents, likely due to the great abundance and availability of these animals throughout the year, in most areas where the snakes reside. In some regions, lizards of the Teiidae family are also part of the diet of C. durissus.

Common names
Common names for the species include: South American rattlesnake, tropical rattler, tropical rattlesnake, neotropical rattlesnake, Guiana rattlesnake (previously used for C. d. dryinus). and in Spanish: víbora de cascabel, cascabel, cascabela, and also in Portuguese, cascavel. In Suriname it is known as Sakasneki.

Geographic range
Crotalus durissus is found in South America except the Andes Mountains. However, its range is discontinuous, with many isolated populations in northern South America, including Colombia, Venezuela, Guyana, Suriname, French Guiana and northern Brazil. It occurs in Colombia and eastern Brazil to southeastern Peru, Bolivia, Paraguay, Uruguay, and northern Argentina (Catamarca, Córdoba, Corrientes, Chaco, Entre Rios, Formosa, La Pampa, La Rioja, Mendoza, Misiones, San Juan, San Luis, Santa Fe, Santiago del Estero and Tucumán). It also occurs on some islands in the Caribbean, including Aruba. The type locality given is "America."

Habitat
It prefers savanna and semi-arid zones. It has been reported to occur in littoral xerophilous scrub, psammophilous and halophilous littoral grassland, thorny xerophilous scrub, tropophilous deciduous and semideciduous scrub, as well as tropophilous semideciduous seasonal forest in the northwest of Venezuela. In the Chaco region of Paraguay, it is found in the drier, sandier areas.

Venom

Bite symptoms are very different from those of Nearctic species due to the presence of neurotoxins (crotoxin and crotamine) that cause progressive paralysis. Bites from C. d. terrificus in particular can result in impaired vision or complete blindness, auditory disorders, ptosis, paralysis of the peripheral muscles, especially of the neck, which becomes so limp as to appear broken, and eventually life-threatening respiratory paralysis. The ocular disturbances are sometimes followed by permanent blindness. Phospholipase A2 neurotoxins also cause damage to skeletal muscles and possibly the heart, causing general aches, pain, and tenderness throughout the body. Myoglobin released into the blood results in dark urine. Other serious complications may result from systemic disorders (incoagulable blood and general spontaneous bleeding), hypotension, and shock. Hemorrhagins may be present in the venom, but any corresponding effects are completely overshadowed by the startling and serious neurotoxic symptoms. Acute renal failure is considered as the main cause of death. The mortality rate of cases without specific serum treatment is 72%, and 11% in cases with specific treatment. The LD50 value is 0,047 mg/kg IV, 0,048 mg/kg IP and 1,4 mg/kg IM. The SC median lethal dose varies widely: 0.0478 mg / kg, 0.6 mg / kg, 0.171-0.193 mg / kg, 78 μg / kg and 74 μg / kg. The lethal dose for 60 kg humans is 18 mg, while the venom yield is 100 mg. A study points out that the rattlesnakes in Roraima, Brazil have two types of venom, with different characteristics of individuals of the same species found in other regions, the two types of venom are known as '' yellow venom '' that attacks the nervous system, causing paralysis, and also kidney and respiratory failure, causes muscle pain and makes urine dark, and the "white venom" is hemorrhagic and causes bleeding.

References

Further reading
 Alvaro ME. 1939. Snake Venom in Ophthalmology. Am. Jour. Opth., Vol. 22, No. 10, pp. 1130–1145.
 Wüster W, Ferguson JE, Quijada-Mascareñas JA, Pook CE, Salomão MG, Thorpe RS. 2005. Tracing an invasion: landbridges, refugia and the phylogeography of the Neotropical rattlesnake (Serpentes: Viperidae: Crotalus durissus). Molecular Ecology 14: 1095–1108. PDF at Wolfgang Wüster. Accessed 28 August 2007.
 Wüster W, Ferguson JE, Quijada-Mascareñas JA, Pook CE, Salomão MG, Thorpe RS. 2005. No rattlesnakes in the rainforests: reply to Gosling and Bush. Molecular Ecology, 14: 3619–3621. PDF at Wolfgang Wüster. Accessed 28 August 2007.
 Quijada-Mascareñas A, JE Ferguson, CE Pook, MG Salomão, RS Thorpe, & W Wüster. 2007. Phylogeographic patterns of Trans-Amazonian vicariants and Amazonian biogeography: The Neotropical rattlesnake (Crotalus durissus complex) as an example. Journal of Biogeography 34: 1296–1312. PDF

External links
 
 

durissus
Snakes of South America
Snakes of the Caribbean
Reptiles of Brazil
Reptiles of Bolivia
Reptiles of Argentina
Reptiles of Colombia
Reptiles of French Guiana
Reptiles of Guyana
Reptiles of Paraguay
Reptiles of Peru
Reptiles of Suriname
Reptiles of Uruguay
Reptiles of Venezuela
Fauna of Aruba
Reptiles described in 1758
Taxa named by Carl Linnaeus